Petalopoma elisabettae is a species of sea snail, a marine gastropod mollusk in the family Siliquariidae.

References

Siliquariidae
Gastropods described in 2002